The Roaring Forties is a 1908 oil painting by Frederick Judd Waugh. The painting depicts a turbulent seascape in the Roaring Forties, the part of the Southern Hemispheric Ocean between the latitudes of 40 and 50 degrees famed for its dangerous storms. Along with Wild Weather, the work is one of two seascape paintings by Waugh on display at the Metropolitan Museum of Art.

References 

Paintings in the collection of the Metropolitan Museum of Art
1908 paintings